Cyllogenes janetae, the scarce evening brown is a brown (Satyrinae) butterfly that is found in the Himalayas. Subspecies Cyllogenes janetae orientalis Monastyrskii, 2005 is found in Vietnam.

Range
The butterfly is found in the Himalayas in Sikkim, Bhutan, northern West Bengal, Assam, Manipur and Nagaland.

Status
In 1932 William Harry Evans described it as very rare.

Description

The scarce evening brown is 90 to 95 mm in wingspan and broadly resembles the Melanitis evening browns, with rich brown colour above. The upper forewing has a broad yellow apical band which reaches the termen. The male, unlike Cyllogenes suradeva does not have a brand on the upper forewing.

See also
Satyrinae
Nymphalidae
List of butterflies of India (Satyrinae)

References

Melanitini
Butterflies of Asia
Butterflies of Indochina